Pool is a department of the Republic of the Congo in the southeastern part of the country. It borders the departments of Bouenza, Lékoumou, and Plateaux. Internationally, it borders the Democratic Republic of the Congo. It also surrounds the commune district of the national capital, Brazzaville.

The regional capital is Kinkala. Principal towns include Boko, Kindamba and Mindouli. In the early 2000s, the Pool region was the home of a low-level insurgency led by Pasteur Ntumi. The inhabitants of this department are the Kongo, the Téké and the Native population (Pygmies).

The region is named after the Pool Malebo (formerly Stanley Pool), a particularly wide stretch of the Congo River here.

Administrative divisions 
Pool Department is divided into thirteen districts:

 Kinkala District
 Boko District
 Mindouli District
 Kindamba District
 Goma Tsé-Tsé District
 Mayama District
 Ngabé District
 Mbanza–Ndounga District
 Louingui District
 Loumo District
 Ignié District
 Vindza District
 Kimba District

References

Republic of the Congo at GeoHive

 
Departments of the Republic of the Congo
Congo River